Greek Orthodox Church may refer to:

 Eastern Orthodox Church, sometimes called 'Eastern Orthodox', the 'Greek Catholic Church' or generally the 'Greek Church'
 Church of Greece, the Eastern Orthodox jurisdiction covering modern Greece
 Any independent church within the worldwide communion of Eastern Orthodoxy that retains use of the Greek language in liturgical settings

See also 
 Eastern Orthodoxy in Greece
 Greek Old Calendarists